Maria Gaspar (born 1980) is an American interdisciplinary artist and educator.

Her works have been exhibited at venues including the MoMA PS1 in NYC, Museum of Contemporary Art located in Chicago, Artspace in New Haven, CT, African American Museum, Philadelphia, PA, and many others. Gaspar's work has been written about in the New York Times Magazine, Artforum, The Chicago Tribune, Hyperallergic, and many other publications.

Early life and education 
Gaspar was born in the Little Village neighborhood of Chicago in 1980. She is first-generation to parents who migrated from Mexico to Chicago's West Side in the 1960's. Her mother was a teacher and professional clown and later went on to be a community-radio DJ in Little Village at a station called WCYC that was part of the Boys & Girls Club. Gaspar has stated in numerous interviews that her mother's work has deeply influenced her art. She attended Whitney M. Young Magnet High School, which had a strong art department, and started her public art career painting community murals. She received a BFA from Pratt Institute in 2002 and in 2009 she received an MFA from the University of Illinois at Chicago.

Career 
Gaspar is an Associate Professor of Contemporary Practices at School of the Art Institute of Chicago.

Gaspar was the founder and director of The 96 Acres Project. Gaspar's body of work has received numerous awards including a 2022 John Simon Guggenheim Fellowship, a 2015 Creative Capital Award, and a 2016 Robert Rauschenberg Artist as Activist Fellowship, amongst many others.

Notable works 

 Unblinking Eyes, Watching
 Radioactive: Stories from Beyond the Wall
 Sounds for Liberation
 The 96 Acres Project (2012–2016) is a collaborative project that examines the impact of incarceration through artistic interventions at the Cook County Jail located in her native community in Chicago.
 Brown Brilliance Darkness Matter
 On the Border of What is Formless and Monstrous
 City As Site

Awards 
 2022 Latinx Artist Fellowship
 2022 Guggenheim Fellowship
 2021 United States Artists Fellowship
 2020 Frieze Impact Prize
 2020 Art Matters Grant
 2018 Imagining Justice Art Grant
 2017 Art Matters Grant
 2017 Chamberlain Award for Social Practice at the Headlands Center for the Arts
 2016 Robert Rauschenberg Artist as Activist Fellowship
 2015 Creative Capital Award
 2015 Joan Mitchell Emerging Artist Grant
 Chicagoan of the Year in the Arts in 2014 by art critic and historian, Lori Waxman
 2008 Sor Juana Women of Achievement Award in Art and Activism from the National Museum of Mexican Art

References 

Living people
1980 births
Artists from Chicago
Hispanic and Latino American women in the arts
Pratt Institute alumni
Hispanic and Latino American artists
21st-century American women